Fitzmaurice Hunt  (November 1821 – 21 April 1891) was an Anglican priest, most notably Archdeacon of Ardagh from 1874 until his death.
 
He was born in County Tipperary and educated at Trinity College, Dublin. Hunt was ordained deacon in 1847 and priest in 1848. He was for many years the Incumbent at Mohill.

References

1821 births
1891 deaths
Alumni of Trinity College Dublin
19th-century Irish Anglican priests
Archdeacons of Ardagh
People from County Tipperary